Kinbuck Bridge or Bridge of Kinbuck is a category B listed structure in the hamlet of Kinbuck in Stirling.

History
The present structure is dated 1752.

In 1715, after resting for the night in Kinbuck, 6,000 Jacobite troops crossed Kinbuck bridge over the River Allan on their way to fight the Hanoverians at the Battle of Sherrifmuir.

Design
It has two spans, and the central cutwater is protected by a concrete island.

References

External links

Category B listed buildings in Stirling (council area)
Listed bridges in Scotland
Bridges completed in 1752